Robert Percival Porter (June 30, 1852 – February 28, 1917) was an American journalist, diplomat, and statistician who wrote on economic subjects. He served as Superintendent of the Census (1889–1893). In the statistical field, the first use of the term "computer" comes in an article in the Journal of the American Statistical Association archives by Porter in 1891. The article discusses about the use of Hermann Hollerith's machine in the 11th Census of the United States.

Early life and education
Robert Percival Porter was born in Norwich, England, June 30, 1852. His father was James Winearls Porter of Marham, Norfolk.

He received his education at King Edward VI School, Norwich, and privately in the U.S.

Career
He removed  to  the  United States  on  the  death  of  his father  in  1869,  and  begran  active  life  as  a  school teacher  in Illinois. When  the  Chicago Inter Ocean  was  founded,  in  1872,  he  joined  the  staff of  that  paper,  though  his  first statistical and economic writings were contributed to the Galaxy, 1876, and The Princeton Review, 1878–79.

From 1879 to 1882,  he  had  charge  of  the  second division  of  the  United States  census  under Gen.  Francis  A.  Walker,  and  wrote  the  official  reports on  wealth,  debt,  taxation,  and  transportation. In  1882,  he  was  appointed  a  member  of  the U.S. Tariff Commission, and in  this  capacity he  took  an  active  part  in  framing  the  tariff law  of  1883.

He  then  joined  the  editorial  staff  of the New-York Tribune and was  sent  to  Europe to study and report industrial and housing conditions on the Continent. He contributed  regular  letters  on European  industries  for  fifteen  months.

Upon  returning to  the  United States  in  1885, he became one of the editors  of The Philadelphia Press. On December 1, 1887, Porter founded the New York Press, assisted by Frank Hatton. In March, 1889, he was  appointed  superintendent of the 11th census, resigning in September 1893, to return to the editorial control of the New York Press.

In  1895–96, Porter reported  on  the industries  and  commerce  of  Japan  for  the  Manufacturers' Association of America. He  framed  the  tariff  laws  for  these  islands  and the  Philippines,  and  conducted  the  negotiations with  Gen.  Gomez  that  ended  in  the  disbandment of  the  Cuban  army. From  1900, he conducted  a  series  of  economic  studies  relating to  street  and  other  railways  in  Europe.

In 1904, he joined the staff of the London Times.

Personal life

On March 7, 1884, he married Alice Hobbins.

He had four children, including Mary "Polly" Winearls Porter.

Robert Percival Porter died February 28, 1917.

Selected works
 The West : from the census of 1880, a history of the industrial, commercial, social, and political development of the states and territories of the West from 1800 to 1880, 1882
 Protection and free trade to-day : at home and abroad, in field and workshop, 1884
 Free trade folly, 1886
 Industrial Cuba : being a study of present commercial and industrial conditions, with suggestions as to the opportunities presented in the Island for American capital, enterprise, and labour, 1899
 Life of William McKinley, soldier, lawyer, statesman, 1896
 The dangers of municipal trading, 1907
 The full recognition of Japan, being a detailed account of the economic progress of the Japanese empire to 1911, 1911
 Japan, the new world-power : being a detailed account of the progress and rise of the Japanese empire, 1915
 Japan, the rise of a modern power, 1917

References

External links
 
 Robert Percival Porter at gracesguide.co.uk

1852 births
1917 deaths
19th-century British journalists
19th-century American journalists
19th-century British newspaper founders
19th-century American newspaper founders
19th-century American economists
19th-century American male writers
20th-century British journalists
20th-century American journalists
20th-century American economists
20th-century American male writers
People from Norwich
English journalists
English newspaper editors
American statisticians
American economics writers
United States Census Bureau people
American male journalists